Richard Chiassaro (born 11 November 1981) is a British Paralympic athlete who competes mainly in category T54 sprint events and middle-distance events.

Early life
Chiassaro was born in England in 1981. Chiassaro was born with spina bifida.

References

British male sprinters
British male wheelchair racers
Living people
1981 births
Athletes (track and field) at the 2016 Summer Paralympics
People with spina bifida
21st-century British people